Manziana is a  (municipality) in the Metropolitan City of Rome in the Italian region of Latium, located about  northwest of Rome.

Manziana borders the following municipalities: Bracciano, Canale Monterano, Oriolo Romano, Tolfa.

References

External links
 Official website
 Tourism Portal

Cities and towns in Lazio